Jerrold Curtis Ballaine is an American painter, sculptor, and educator. He is Emeritus Professor of Art at the University of California, Berkeley.

Ballaine has done significant work as a sculptor. Most of his work involves creating female figures with lines and flow while adding texture and motion to the figurative sculpturing. Some of his works involves modernized aspects of Greek sculpturing while adding colors to the stone carving. His work has been represented in numerous collections, including Whitney Museum of American Art, Oakland Museum of California, Museum of Art, Rhode Island School of Design, Smithsonian Institute, SFMOMA Wichita Art Museum, Swiss State Museum, Amon Carter Museum, Denver Art Museum, Joslyn Art Museum, San Jose Museum of Art, Crocker Art Museum, Logan Museum of Art, and several private collections.

During his tenure as an Art Professor, Ballaine was Acting Director of the University Art Museum. In 1980, he was awarded the Humanities Research Fellowship.

Education
Ballaine attended the University of Washington, Seattle from 1952 to 1955. He subsequently joined Art Center School in Los Angeles in 1958. Later on, he completed his B.F.A. degree from the California School of Fine Arts in San Francisco in 1959, and his M.F.A. degree from the San Francisco Art Institute in 1961.

Career
Ballaine started his teaching career in 1963 at Cornish School of Allied Arts, Seattle. In 1965, he joined the University of California, Berkeley and worked there till 1994. During his teaching career, he received many awards including; Summer Faculty Fellowship in 1969, Creative Arts Institute Grant in 1971, Humanities Research Fellowship in 1980. He also served as Interim Museum Director for a year from 1975 to 1976 during his teaching career in the University of California.

Works
Ballaine held his first solo exhibition, containing colored figurative paintings, at Zabriskie Gallery, New York in 1960. His second exhibition was held at Gump's Gallery, San Francisco, California in 1961. He has curated over forty solo exhibitions, and participated in over 40 group exhibitions. He led the Funk movement of the 1970s. His work is inspired by his mentor Richard Diebenkorn.

Ballaine started out from Abstract Expressionism, and has worked extensively on sculptures and oil-paintings. His art has been displayed in numerous museums all across America. Jack Leissring, who is a collector of art, has compiled two books for Ballaine’s life journey named, So Many Roads Tease My Soul Book 1 and Book 2. In the books, Leissring explains Ballaine’s contributions to figurative painting and sculpture.

Sculptures
Ballaine’s most recent work is as a sculptor. He uses clay, fabricated plastic, and marble. Although, he has been making sculptures since the beginning of his career, he started working on stones in 2004, inspired by his trip to Egypt in 1995. He uses veined stone for his sculptures using the lines and irregularities to craft the sculptures. He also uses permanent stains to further enhance the forms and flow of the human anatomy. Jack Leissring in his book Color in Three Dimensions the Sculpture of Jerrold Ballaine states how his sculptures "move and flow in countless dimensions, and offer new prospects of imagination for the new stone carvers." Some of his recent works, with the fabricated plastic, are Pearls and Flakes, The Me  Generation Anonymous Selfies, Anonymous Selfie  #19, Half Here, and "SALESFORCE. 

Oil painting
Ballaine’s oil-painted landscapes and figure paintings are composed of thickly layered paint. Scott A. Shields, Chief Curator/Associate Director at Crocker Art Museum, Sacramento, in his essay explains Ballaine’s process of making oil paintings. He explains that Ballaine starts with taking pictures of the model, and then making drawings from the pictures. Some of his well-recognized paintings are Nude with Pencil Breasts, Roller Skate Game # 1, Gold Lily Pond, Inside the boat house, Sonoma Landscape, Seated Girl, Nude with a Blue Stripe, and Bay Farm Road. Jack Leissring has also compiled two books for Ballaine’s paintings, named Jerrold Ballaine, Winter Landscapes and Winter Trees, recent paintings by Jerrold Ballaine''.

Awards and honors
1960 - San Francisco Museum of Drawing and Print Art, Annual Award

Bibliography

Exhibitions
1995 - Kuwait Museum.  Al-Adwane Gallery, Guest of Kuwait Govt.
1995 - Traveled Egypt
1998 - Trosa, Sweden
1998 - Gallery "C" International, Paris, France
1999 - Athens Gallery, Athens, Greece
2004 - Quicksilver Mine Co. Forestville, CA.
2006 - 1212 Gallery, Burlingame, CA.
2008 - Withywindle Gallery, Guerneville, Calif 
2010 - JC Leisering, Santa Rosa, Ca.  May- June
2014	Christie Marks Gallery, Healdsburg, Ca., May 9 - June 22, 201

References 

Living people
20th-century American painters
American sculptors
University of California, Berkeley faculty
University of Washington alumni
1934 births
21st-century American painters